
Kalina Lake  or  Busch Lake is a lake in the Sur Lípez Province, Potosí Department, Bolivia. At an elevation of 4525 m, its surface area is 20.6 km².

References 

Lakes of Potosí Department